Zygaena cocandica is a moth of the family Zygaenidae. It is found in Uzbekistan, Tajikistan and Kyrgyzstan.
In Seitz it is described as "A very remarkable form with yellow spots on the forewing, only the basal ones being shaded with red, it has sometimes an entirely red abdomen ab.karategini Gr.-Grsh., from Buchara" Also in Seitz 
as erschoffi Stgr. it is described as having "spots 5  and 6 often widely separate, standing side by side rather than one below the other; collar and 1-2 abdominal segments red, sometimes also the shoulders, as in our last figure: Pamir.".The length of the forewings is about 12 mm.

Subspecies
Zygaena cocandica cocandica (southern Kyrgyzstan)
Zygaena cocandica minor
Zygaena cocandica hafiza (Tajikistan)

References

External links
Colour Atlas of the Siberian Lepidoptera

Zygaena
Moths described in 1874
Moths of Asia